Lobesia vanillana is a moth of the family Tortricidae. It was described in 1900 by Joseph de Joannis from five males and one female from Réunion island.
It is found in Réunion, Aldabra atoll, Picard Island, Madagascar, Kenya and Nigeria.

The length is about 6 mm.

Larvae have been found on Vanilla planifolia (de Joannis, 1900 and Diakanoff, 1969) and Mangifera sp. (Diakanoff, 1969)

References

External links
 Picture of Lobesia vanillana on Flickr

Moths described in 1900
Olethreutini
Moths of Madagascar
Moths of Seychelles
Moths of Réunion
Moths of Sub-Saharan Africa